The men's 6 miles event at the 1954 British Empire and Commonwealth Games was held on 1 July at the Empire Stadium in Vancouver, Canada.

Results

References

Athletics at the 1954 British Empire and Commonwealth Games
1954